Debora Schoon-Kadijk (born 14 April 1969 in Rotterdam, South Holland) is a former professional beach volleyball player from the Netherlands. She twice represented her native country at the Summer Olympics, in 1996 and 2000. Partnering her sister Rebekka Kadijk she claimed the bronze medal at the 2000 European Championships in Bilbao, Spain, after having won silver two years earlier on Rhodes.

Playing partners
 Rebekka Kadijk
 Mareille te Winkel
 Lisette van de Ven

References

External links
 
 
 

1969 births
Living people
Dutch women's beach volleyball players
Beach volleyball players at the 1996 Summer Olympics
Beach volleyball players at the 2000 Summer Olympics
Olympic beach volleyball players of the Netherlands
Sportspeople from Rotterdam